Artistic swimming as Synchronized swimming was contested from December 13 to December 15 at the 1998 Asian Games in Thammasat Aquatic Center, Bangkok, Thailand. A total of 16 athletes from seven nations competed in the event, Japan won both gold medals, South Korea won both silver medals and China won all bronze medals.

Medalists

Medal table

Participating nations
A total of 16 athletes from 7 nations competed in artistic swimming at the 1998 Asian Games:

References
 Results

External links 
 Olympic Council of Asia

 
1998 Asian Games events
1998
Asian Games
1998 Asian Games